Jeremy Ebert (born April 6, 1989) is a former American football wide receiver. He was drafted by the New England Patriots in the seventh round of the 2012 NFL Draft. He played college football at Northwestern.

Early years
Ebert was born in Willard, Ohio.  Since then he has lived in Brooklyn, Ohio, Perrysburg, Ohio, and Hilliard, Ohio, where he attended Hilliard Darby High School.

College career
During college, he played for Northwestern Wildcats as a wide-receiver and was an All-Big Ten selection his senior year.

Professional career

New England Patriots
The New England Patriots selected Ebert in the seventh round (235th overall) of the 2012 NFL Draft. He was released on August 31 during the final cuts of the pre-season.

Philadelphia Eagles
Ebert was signed to the Philadelphia Eagles practice squad on September 13.

Second stint with Patriots
On November 27, Ebert tweeted that he was "heading back to where it all began" and was signed to the Patriots' practice squad the next day.

On April 29, 2013, it was announced that Ebert was released by the Patriots.

Jacksonville Jaguars
Ebert was signed by the Jacksonville Jaguars on May 22, 2013.

He was later released on August 30 and signed to the team's practice squad on September 1. He was promoted to the active roster on September 14. He registered his first career reception in Week 2 against the Oakland Raiders.

He was involved in numerous roster transactions over the season, and was signed to the active roster on November 23.

He was released on May 12, 2014.

Atlanta Falcons
Ebert signed with the Atlanta Falcons on July 22, 2014.

References

External links
 
 Northwestern Wildcats bio

1989 births
Living people
People from Hilliard, Ohio
Players of American football from Ohio
American football wide receivers
Northwestern Wildcats football players
New England Patriots players
Philadelphia Eagles players
Jacksonville Jaguars players
Atlanta Falcons players
People from Willard, Ohio
People from Brooklyn, Ohio
People from Perrysburg, Ohio